Uppaluri Gopala Krishnamurti (9 July 1918 – 22 March 2007) was an intellectual who questioned the state of spiritual enlightenment. Having pursued a religious path in his youth and eventually rejecting it, U.G. claimed to have experienced a devastating biological transformation on his 49th birthday, an event he refers to as "the calamity".  He emphasized that this transformation back to "the natural state" is a rare, acausal, biological occurrence with no religious context. Because of this, he discouraged people from pursuing the "natural state" as a spiritual goal.

He rejected the very basis of thought and in doing so negated all systems of thought and knowledge. Hence he explained his assertions were experiential and not speculative – "Tell them that there is nothing to understand."

He was unrelated to his contemporary Jiddu Krishnamurti, although the two men had a number of meetings because of their association with the Theosophical Society.

Early life
U.G. was born on 9 July 1918 in Machilipatnam, a town in coastal Andhra Pradesh, India, and raised in the nearby town of Gudivada. His mother died seven days after he was born, and he was brought up by his maternal grandfather, a wealthy Brahmin lawyer, who was also involved in the Theosophical Society. U.G. also became a member of the Theosophical Society during his teenage years and mentions having "inherited" his association with the Theosophical Society from his grandfather. South Indian actress Gautami is his very close relative.

During the same period of his life, U.G. reportedly practised various austerities and apparently sought moksha or spiritual enlightenment. To that end, between the ages of 14 and 21, he undertook a variety of spiritual exercises, determined to find out whether moksha was possible. Wanting to achieve that state, he had also resolved to prove that if there were people who have thus "realized" themselves, they could not be hypocritical. As part of this endeavour, he searched for a person who was an embodiment of such "realization".

He spent seven summers in the Himalayas with Swami Sivananda studying yoga and practising meditation. During his 20s, U.G. began attending the University of Madras, studying psychology, philosophy, mysticism, and the sciences. He dropped out of the Master's program with the idea that the answers of the West – to what he considered were essential questions – were no better than those of the East.

Quest
In 1939, at age 21, U.G. met with renowned spiritual teacher Ramana Maharshi. U.G. related that he asked Ramana, "This thing called moksha, can you give it to me?" – to which Ramana Maharshi purportedly replied, "I can give it, but can you take it?". This answer completely altered U.G.'s perceptions of the "spiritual path" and its practitioners. Later, U.G. would say that Maharshi's answer – which he perceived as "arrogant" – put him "back on track".

In 1941, he began working for the Theosophical Society, in C.W. Leadbeater's library. Shortly after, he began an international lecture tour on behalf of the Society, visiting Norway, Belgium, Germany and the United States. Returning to India, he married a Brahmin woman named Kusuma Kumari in 1943, at age 25.

From 1947 to 1953, U.G. regularly attended talks given by Jiddu Krishnamurti in Madras, India, eventually beginning a direct dialogue with him in 1953. U.G. related that the two had almost daily discussions for a while, which he asserted were not providing satisfactory answers to his questions. Finally, their meetings came to a halt. He described part of the final discussion:

After the break-up with Jiddu Krishnamurti, U.G. continued travelling, still lecturing. At about the same time he claims to have been "puzzled" by the continuing appearance of certain psychic powers. In 1955, U.G. and his family went to the United States to seek medical treatment for his eldest son, and stayed there for five years.:1

London period
He ultimately separated from his family and went to live in London. While sitting one day in Hyde Park, he was confronted by a police officer who threatened to lock him up if he didn't leave the park. Down to his last five pence, he made his way to the Ramakrishna Mission of London where the residing Swami gave him money for a hotel room for the night. The following day, U.G. began working for the Ramakrishna Mission, an arrangement that lasted for three months. Before leaving the mission he left a letter for the residing Swamiji telling him that he had become a new man.:2

About this time, Jiddu Krishnamurti was in London and the two Krishnamurtis renewed their acquaintance. Jiddu tried to advise U.G. on his recent marital troubles, but U.G. didn't want his help. Jiddu eventually persuaded him to attend a few talks he was giving in London, which U.G. did, but found himself bored listening to him.:3

In 1961, U.G. put an end to his relationship with his wife. Their marriage had been a largely unhappy affair, and by that time he described himself as being "detached" from his family, emotionally as well as physically. He then left London and spent three months living in Paris, using funds he had obtained by selling his unused return ticket to India, during which time he ate a different variety of cheese each day. Down to his last 150 francs, he decided to go to Switzerland where he still had a small bank account. By mistake he went by train to Geneva, rather than Zurich, where the bank account was.

Early Swiss period
After two weeks in Geneva, U.G. was unable to pay his hotel bill and sought refuge at the Indian Consulate. He was listless, without hope, and described himself as "finished" – he requested that he be sent back to India, which the consular authorities refused to do at the state's expense. A consulate employee in her 60s named Valentine de Kerven offered U.G. shelter. Valentine and U.G. became good friends, and she provided him with a home in Switzerland.

For the next few years, the questions regarding the subject of enlightenment – or anything else – did not interest him, and he did nothing to further his enquiry. But by 1967, U.G. was again concerned with the subject of enlightenment, wanting to know what that state was, which sages such as Siddhārtha Gautama purportedly attained. Hearing that Jiddu Krishnamurti was giving a talk in Saanen, U.G. decided to attend. During the talk, Jiddu was describing the state and U.G. thought that it referred to himself. He explained it as follows:

He continues:

Calamity
The next day U.G. was again pondering the question "How do I know I am in that state?" with no answer forthcoming. He later recounted that on suddenly realising the question had no answer, there was an unexpected physical, as well as psychological, reaction. It seemed to him like "a sudden 'explosion' inside, blasting, as it were, every cell, every nerve and every gland in my body." Afterwards, he started experiencing what he called "the calamity", a series of bizarre physiological transformations that took place over the course of a week, affecting each one of his senses, and finally resulting in a deathlike experience. He described it this way:

Upon the eighth day:

U.G. could not, and did not, explain the provenance of the calamity experiences. In response to questions, he maintained that it happened "in spite of" his pre-occupation with – and search for – enlightenment. He also maintained that the calamity had nothing to do with his life up to that point, or with his upbringing. Several times he described the calamity happening to him as a matter of chance, and he insisted that he could not possibly, in any way, impart that experience to anybody else.

Post-calamity
According to U.G., his life-story can be separated into the pre- and post-calamity parts. Describing his post-calamity life, he claimed to be functioning permanently in what he called "the natural state": A state of spontaneous, purely physical, sensory existence, characterised by discontinuity – though not absence – of thought. U.G. also maintained that upon finding himself in the "natural state", he had lost all acquired knowledge and memories, and had to re-learn everything, as if "...the slate had been wiped clean".

After his calamity experience, U.G. often traveled to countries around the world, declining to hold formal discussions yet talking freely to visitors and those that sought him out. He gave his only formal post-calamity public talk in India, in 1972.

His unorthodox non-message philosophy and the often uncompromising, direct style of its presentation, generated a measure of notoriety and sharply-divided opinions. At the extremes, some people considered him enlightened, while others considered him nothing more than a charlatan. The clamour increased as books and articles about U.G. and his newly expounded philosophy continued appearing.

Several of his group discussions and interviews have been published in books, or are carried verbatim on various websites. There is also a variety of audio and video documents available online.

Health
U.G. was known for his unusual health and diet preferences. Carrying with him a "portable kitchen" in a tiny suitcase throughout his travels, he consumed a great deal of salt and cream, and stated "no meal should take longer than a few minutes to prepare." After 1949, U.G. never saw a doctor or took medication, believing the body would take care of itself. Often complimented for good looks in his old age, U.G. would respond "that's because I don't eat healthy food, I don't take vitamins, and I don't exercise!"

Death
On 22 March 2007, U.G. died at Vallecrosia in Italy. He had slipped and injured himself and was bedridden for seven weeks before his death. Three friends, including long-term devotee Mahesh Bhatt, were by his side when he died. In February 2007, he had dictated his final speech, "My Swan Song".

U.G. had asked that no rituals or funeral rites be conducted upon his death; also, he did not leave instructions on how to dispose of his body. His body was cremated by Bhatt the next day. True to his own philosophy, U.G. did not want to be remembered after his death.

Philosophy

U.G. emphasised the impossibility and non-necessity of any human change, radical or mundane. These assertions, he stated, cannot be considered as a "teaching", that is, something intended to be used to bring about a change. He insisted that the body and its actions are already perfect, and he considered attempts to change or mould the body as violations of the peace and the harmony that is already there. The psyche or self or mind, an entity which he denied as having any being, is composed of nothing but the "demand" to bring about change in the world, in itself, or in both. Furthermore, human self-consciousness is not a thing, but a movement, one characterised by "perpetual malcontent" and a "fascist insistence" on its own importance and survival.

U.G. denied the existence of an individual mind. However, he accepted the concept of a world mind, which according to him contained the accumulation of the totality of man's knowledge and experience. He also used "thought sphere" (atmosphere of thoughts) synonymously with the term "world mind". He stated that human beings inhabit this thought realm or thought sphere and that the human brain acts like an antenna, picking and choosing thoughts according to its needs. U.G. held all human experience to be the result of this process of thought. The self-consciousness or "I" in human beings is born out of the need to give oneself continuity through the constant utilisation of thought. When this continuity is broken, even for a split second, its hold on the body is broken and the body falls into its natural rhythm. Thought also falls into its natural place – then it can no longer interfere or influence the working of the human body. In the absence of any continuity, the arising thoughts combust.

In its natural state, the senses of the body take on independent existences (uncoordinated by any "inner self") and the ductless glands (that correspond to the locations of the Hindu chakras) become reactivated. U.G. described how it is the pineal gland, or the Ajna Chakra, that takes over the functioning of the body in the natural state, as opposed to thought.

U.G. also maintained that the reason people came to him (and to gurus) was to find solutions for their everyday real problems, and/or for solutions to a fabricated problem, namely, the search for spirituality and enlightenment. He insisted that this search is caused by the cultural environment, which demands conformity of individuals as it simultaneously places within them the desire to be special – the achievement of enlightenment thus viewed as a crowning expression of an individual's "specialness" and uniqueness. Consequently, the desire for enlightenment is exploited by gurus, spiritual teachers, and other "sellers of shoddy goods", who pretend to offer various ways to reach that goal. According to U.G., all these facilitators never deliver, and cannot ever deliver, since the goal itself (i.e. enlightenment), is unreachable.

According to U.G., "The so called self-realization is the discovery for yourself and by yourself that there is no self to discover. That will be a very shocking thing because it's going to blast every nerve, every cell, even the cells in the marrow of your bones."

Popular culture 
The Raging Sage webcomic features a sage-like character loosely inspired by U.G.

The character GJ from Top of the Lake is based on U.G.

See also
 Myth of Progress
 Nihilism
 Skepticism

Notes

References

Further reading
 Nicolas C. Grey, James Farley, This Dog Barking: The Strange Story of U.G. Krishnamurti, 2017, Harper Element. Graphic Novel. .
 Mukunda Rao, The Biology of Enlightenment: Unpublished Conversations of U.G. Krishnamurti After He Came into The Natural State (1967–71), 2011, HarperCollins India.
 Louis Brawley, No More Questions. The final travels of U.G. Krishnamurti, 2011. Penguin Books. .
 Shanta Kelker, The Sage And the Housewife, 2005, Smriti Books. .
 Mukunda Rao, The Other Side of Belief: Interpreting U.G. Krishnamurti, 2005, Penguin Books. .
 K. Chandrasekhar, J. S. R. L. Narayana Moorty, Stopped in Our Tracks: Stories of UG in India, 2005, Smriti Books. .
 Mahesh Bhatt, U.G. Krishnamurti: A Life, 1992, Viking. .
 The Courage to Stand Alone: Conversations with U.G. Krishnamurti, 2001, Smriti Books. .
 The Mystique of Enlightenment: The Radical Ideas of U.G. Krishnamurti, 2002, Sentient Publications. . Also published as The Mystique of Enlightenment: The Unrational ideas of a man called U.G., 2005, Smriti Books. .
 Thought is Your Enemy: Conversations with U.G. Krishnamurti, 2002, Smriti Books. .
 The Little Book of Questions, 2003, Penguin Books. .
 Mind Is a Myth: Conversations with U.G. Krishnamurti, 2003, Smriti Books. .
 No Way Out: Conversations with U.G. Krishnamurti, 2005, Smriti Books. .
 The Natural State, In the words of U.G. Krishnamurti, 2005, Smriti Books. .
 The Penguin U.G. Krishnamurti Reader, 2007, Penguin Books. . (Mukunda Rao, Editor)
 Thought Is Dead: Moving Beyond Spiritual Materialism, 2010, . (Includes partial transcript of dialogue with David Bohm)
 The Anti Guru: A Selection of His Greatest Talks, 2010, .

External links

 Krishnamurti, U. G. (Uppaluri Gopala) Books and Interviews Online
  U.G. Krishnamurti.net Most of the published works by, and about, U.G. can be found here and read freely on- or offline in their entirety.

1918 births
2007 deaths
20th-century Indian philosophers
Indian spiritual writers
Indian spiritual teachers
People from Machilipatnam
People from Krishna district
Writers from Andhra Pradesh